State Road 325 (NM 325) is a  state highway in the US state of New Mexico. NM 325's western terminus is at U.S. Route 64 and U.S. Route 87 (US 64/87) in Capulin, and the eastern terminus is at US 64/87 in Des Moines.

Major intersections

See also

References

325
Transportation in Union County, New Mexico